I Thought U Knew is the third album by rapper, Candyman. The album was released on June 29, 1993 for IRS Records and was produced by Candyman himself. The album was a huge commercial and critical failure not making it on any album charts or producing any hit singles.

Track listing
 "Skinz On Deck"
 "Sex It Up"
 "Wat Eva U Lyke"
 "Candyman, Do Me Right"
 "First Date"
 "Just Like Candy"
 "Life Goes On"
 "Don't Cry Dry Your Eyes"
 "Return Of The Candyman"
 "I Thought U Knew"
 "Get Respect"

References

1993 albums
Candyman (rapper) albums
I.R.S. Records albums
Albums produced by DJ Quik